Namentenga is one of the 45 provinces of Burkina Faso, located in its Centre-Nord Region.

Its capital is Boulsa.

Departments
Namentenga is divided into 8 departments:
 Boala
 Boulsa
 Bouroum
 Dargo
 Nagbingou
 Tougouri
 Yalgo
 Zéguédéguin

See also
Regions of Burkina Faso
Provinces of Burkina Faso
Communes of Burkina Faso

References

 
Provinces of Burkina Faso